Belfast West by-election may refer to one of four by-elections held for the British House of Commons constituency of Belfast West, in Northern Ireland:

 1903 Belfast West by-election
 1943 Belfast West by-election
 1950 Belfast West by-election
 2011 Belfast West by-election